Paalattu Kunjikannan is a 1980 Indian Malayalam-language film directed and produced by Boban Kunchacko. The film stars Prem Nazir, Jayan and Jagathy Sreekumar. The film has musical score by G. Devarajan.

Plot
Palattu Kunjikannan (Prem Nazir)is in love with the Princess Aaryamala(Jayabharathi).His friend Vanchiyoor Surasu (Jayan), a brave warrior and Martial Arts Guru, promises to support him in his quest. But then Surasu falls in love with Ponni (Unnimary) the daughter of the Gurukkal with whom Palattu Kunjikannan is supposed to fight a duel. Ponni makes Surasu promise that he will persuade Kunjikannan not to kill the Gurukkal if he surrenders. In the duel Kunjikannan manages to keep the letter of his promise to Surasu to not spill a drop of Gurukkal's blood, but kills him all the same. Surasu is disappointed but understanding and he makes his way to Ponni's house to make amends. Ponni is angry with what she perceives as Surasu's betrayal. Palattu Kunjikannan weds the princess Aaryamala while Ponni decides to forgive Surasu and leave with him to Kadthanadu after she saves him from her cousin/friend who plots to murder him.

Cast

Prem Nazir as Palattu Kunjikannan
Jayan as Vanchiyoor Surasu
Jayabharathi as Aaryamala
Unnimary as Ponni
Jagathy Sreekumar as Foot Soldier
Thikkurissy Sukumaran Nair as Kunjikannan's grandfather
Bobby Kottarakkara as Drummer boy
Alummoodan
G. K. Pillai as Kadavathoor Gurukkal
Ratheesh as Kunjikannan's father
Janardanan as Thampikutti
Kaduvakulam Antony as Foot Soldier
N. Govindankutty as Padakuruppu
P. K. Abraham as Maharajah of Sreerangam 
Premji as Temple Priest
S. P. Pillai
Santhakumari (Malayalam actress) as Chirutheyi
Roja Ramani as Kunjulekshmi
jyothilakshmi and jayamalini as dancers in sapthaswarangal unarnu song

Soundtrack
The music was composed by G. Devarajan with lyrics by Yusufali Kechery.

References

External links
 

1980 films
1980s Malayalam-language films